Shawn David Vincent (born June 2, 1968) is a former professional American football defensive back who played in the National Football League.

Vincent was born in Bellaire, Ohio.  He attended St. Clairsville High School, where he was named all-conference as both quarterback and defensive back in 1986 and accepted a scholarship to play college football for the University of Akron as a defensive back. He left Akron to play for the Pittsburgh Steelers in 1991, during which he intercepted two passes from decorated quarterback Warren Moon in a single game. Vincent attended summer training with the Steelers prior to the 1992 season, but it was announced in July that he had left camp, and he was not on the 1992 final roster. He was inducted into the OVAC Hall of Fame in 2012 and the St. Clairsville High School Hall of Fame in 2013.

References

1968 births
Living people
Players of American football from Ohio
American football defensive backs
Pittsburgh Steelers players